Owasco Inlet is a river located in Cayuga County, New York. It starts at an unnamed marsh north of Freeville, New York and flows north before emptying into Owasco Lake.

References

Rivers of Cayuga County, New York
Rivers of New York (state)
Rivers of Tompkins County, New York